Rafael de Mattos Andriato (born 20 October 1987) is a Brazilian professional road bicycle racer, who currently rides for UCI Continental team .

Born in São Paulo, Andriato has competed as a professional since the start of the 2012 season, joining the  team from the Petroli-Firenze squad. In May 2012, Andriato took his first victory for the team, by winning the Jurmala GP in Latvia. He only competed in one Grand Tour in his entire career, the 2013 Giro d'Italia, but in that race he won the Intermediate Sprints competition as well as the Premio della Fuga, which was a competition for the most active breakaway riders.

Major results

2006
 2nd Tour de Mato Grosso
 2nd Prova Ciclística 9 de Julho
2007
 1st Prova Ciclística 9 de Julho
 1st Meeting Internacional de Goiania
 1st Stage 1 Volta do Rio de Janeiro
 Volta de Ciclismo Internacional do Estado de São Paulo
1st Points classification
1st Stages 4 & 10
 1st Stage 1 Volta do Paraná
 7th Copa America de Ciclismo
2008
 1st G.P. di Roncoleva
 1st Memorial Benfenati
 1st Memorial Fratelli Gandolfi
 3rd GP San Luigi
 3rd M.O. Città di Villanova
 3rd Circuito dell'Assunta
 4th Trofeo Avis Aido
 4th Trofeo Pama Prefabbricati
 4th Memorial Vincenzo Mantovani
 4th Gran Premio Rinascita
 5th Gran Premio San Gottardo
2009
 1st Giro del Veneto
 1st Memorial Fratelli Gandolfi
 2nd Giro dei Tre Ponti
 2nd Trofeo Papà Cervi
 3rd Circuito Notturno Città di San Donà
 3rd G.P. Site Marchiol Pasta Montegrappa
 3rd Coppa Comune di Piubega
 4th GP San Bernardino
 4th GP Città di Valeggio
 4th Memorial Carlo Valentini
 4th Piccola Agostoni
 5th Medaglia d'Oro Fiera di Sommacampagna
 5th Circuito dell'Assunta
 5th Circuito Silvanese
 5th M.O. O. Bottecchia-Notturna
 5th Coppa Città di Lonigo
 6th Coppa Città di San Daniele
 6th Trofeo Avis
 6th Gran Premio San Luigi
 6th Trofeo Alcide Degasperi
 6th Coppa Caduti Buscatesi
 6th Trofeo Città di San Vendemiano
 7th Memorial Vittime del Vajont 9 Ottobre 1963
 7th Coppa Città di Este
 7th Gran Premio di Roncoleva
 7th La Popolarissima
 8th Gran Premio Città di Verona
2010
 1st GP Ezio del Rosso
 1st Medaglia d'Oro Frare De Nardi
 2nd Astico–Brenta
 2nd Medaglia d'Oro Fiera di Sommacampagna
 2nd Coppa Ballerini
 2nd Gran Premio Industrie del Marmo
 2nd Circuito del Porto
 2nd Memorial Gerry Gasparotto
 2nd Piccola Sanremo
 3rd Coppa Collecchio
 3rd GP Bianco di Custoza
 3rd G.P. Ind. Comm. Art. Comune di Botticino
 3rd Trofeo Rosalpina
 3rd GP Montanino
 4th Trofeo Gianfranco Bianchin
 4th Giro del Veneto
 4th GP Città di Felino
 4th Memorial Angelo Ripamonti
 5th Coppa San Geo
 6th GP Colli Rovescalesi
 7th GP Cementizillo
 7th La Popolarissima
 7th Trofeo Franco Balestra
 9th Coppa Placci
2011
 1st Gran Premio Industrie del Marmo
 1st Trofeo Petroli Firenze
 1st Trofeo Città di Lastra a Signa
 1st Coppa Festa in Fiera San Salvatore
 1st Stage 2 Volta do Rio de Janeiro
 2nd Gran Premio Industria Commercio Artigianato
 2nd Coppa Ciuffenna
 3rd Trofeo Corsanico
 3rd Trofeo Matteotti
 3rd Parma–La Spezia
 3rd Coppa Comune di Castiglion Fiorentino
 4th GP Città di Vinci
 5th Trofeo Nesti e Nelli Concessionaria Toyota
 7th Trofeo Adolfo Leoni
 9th GP Sportivi Chiassa Superiore
2012
 1st Jūrmala GP
 1st Châteauroux Classic
 2nd Road race, National Road Championships
 8th Grand Prix Impanis-Van Petegem
 10th Paris–Brussels
2013
 1st Stage 2 Tour do Rio
 Giro d'Italia
1st Premio della Fuga
1st Traguardo Volante classification
 2nd Jūrmala GP
 9th Gran Premio Industria e Commercio di Prato
 10th Gran Premio Bruno Beghelli
2014
 Tour do Rio
1st Stages 2, 5 & 6
 1st Stage 8 Vuelta a Venezuela
 4th Memorial Marco Pantani
 4th Gran Premio Bruno Beghelli
 7th Gran Premio della Costa Etruschi
 9th Gran Premio Nobili Rubinetterie
 9th Grand Prix de Fourmies
2015
 1st Prologue Sibiu Cycling Tour
2016
 1st Stage 1 Tour of Hainan
2018
 1st Stage 6 Vuelta del Uruguay
 8th Road race, Pan American Road Championships
2019
 5th Road race, National Road Championships
2021
 8th Road race, Pan American Road Championships

Grand Tour general classification results timeline

References

External links
Farnese Vini-Selle Italia profile

Cycling Quotient profile

Brazilian male cyclists
Brazilian road racing cyclists
1987 births
Living people
Sportspeople from São Paulo
21st-century Brazilian people
20th-century Brazilian people